Jay Meuser (September 28, 1911 — August 19, 1963) was an American abstract expressionist painter. Meuser's style was versatile and his works prolific. In his lifetime he worked as an illustrator, portrait painter and cartoonist for several newspaper editorial pages.

Biography
He married Dorothy Ellen Morris in 1938. Their only child, Jacqueline Ellen Meuser, married Suren Saroyan, MD, cousin of the famous American Playwright William Saroyan.

"I've led a most full life," he said to his wife just before his death. Besides teaching at the Art School of San Francisco, he had been a baseball pitcher, a vaudeville performer, a sailor working around the world twice, and "was more than a fair boxer." He had worn 14 different law enforcement badges. At 31, he was the youngest chief of police in Marin County, California. As a member of the Sheet Metal Workers International, he worked at the Terminal Island Naval Shipyard. There he was awarded the Navy's "Certificate of Award" for a suggestion that was adopted concerning the building of naval ships. He also wrote a column in the union's newspaper.

Career
Meuser painted many of the 20th century prominent personalities, including Presidents Franklin D. Roosevelt, Dwight D. Eisenhower, Harry S. Truman, Richard M. Nixon and John F. Kennedy. His portrait of Roosevelt hung in the White House and he received a personal letter of thanks from the late president. While at the shipyard, he was commissioned to paint the portraits of Rear Admiral and Mrs. Paul Hendren, USN and Rear Admiral T. P. Wynkoop USN. He drew two sketches of General Douglas MacArthur in 1950; each accompanying editorials in the Long Beach Press Telegram. The latter sketch prompted an oil painting commissioned by a prominent businessman in the San Francisco Bay Area. Shortly after his death, the original sketch of General MacArthur was donated to Fort MacArthur, San Pedro CA by his wife in 1964. In addition to his oil, water and casein paint colors, he also did many editorial cartoon sketches for newspapers.

Later work

By 1949, Meuser had devoted his life to painting full-time. Around 1950 he became interested in abstraction. Previously, his subjects were depicted in realistic terms. He wrote about his painting Mare Nostrum, "It is far better to capture the glorious spirit of the sea than to paint all of its tiny ripples." The vast majority of his artwork was painted between 1949 and 1957. The variety and quality of his work, as well as the quantity, during this period was significant.

As President of the San Pedro Art Association in 1953, he oversaw three galleries and designed, renovated and constructed plans for the group's first permanent gallery. In 1955 he was elected a member of the nationwide California Water Color Society (currently known as the National Watercolor Society), where he was close friends with past presidents Arnold Franz Brasz and Leonard Edmondson. He participated and won awards in scores of art exhibitions across the country. His award winning painting Occultation went on tour in the traveling section of the California Water Color Society's Annual Exhibition of 1962. His abstract work Northward was requested by the Long Beach Museum of Art in 1957 and remains in the museum's permanent collection as Abstract Expressionism.

Honors and recognition
 California Legislature, State Assembly Certificate of Recognition, July 7, 2011.
 City of Los Angeles Certificate of Tribute, July 7, 2011.
 County of Los Angeles Commendation, July 7, 2011.
 Plaque Dedication by the San Pedro Art Association honoring Jay Meuser, mounted on an historical building in the heart of the San Pedro Art Walk, July 7, 2011.
 Jay Meuser Memorial Award, presented by the National Watercolor Society for Abstract Art.

Purchase prizes
 San Pedro Art Patrons Purchase Award, 1953.
 Top Recommendation for Purchase by Jury of Awards — Long Beach Museum of Art, 1957.

Exhibitions

 Los Angeles County Museum, Los Angeles, California
 California Palace of the Legion of Honor, San Francisco, California
 Oakland Art Museum, Oakland, California
 Virginia Museum of Fine Art, Richmond, Virginia
 California State Fair, Sacramento, California
 National Orange Show, San Bernardino, California
 Pasadena Museum of Art, Pasadena, California
 Denver Art Museum, Denver, Colorado
 National Institute of Modern Art, Mexico City, Mexico
 The Institute of Contemporary Art, Boston, Massachusetts
 University of Southern California, Los Angeles, California
 Santa Barbara Museum of Art, Santa Barbara, California
 DeCordova Museum of Art, Lincoln Massachusetts
 Santa Monica Art Gallery, Santa Monica, California
 Long Beach Museum of Art, Long Beach, California
 Palos Verdes Library/Gallery, Palos Verdes Estates, California
 Richmond Art Center, Richmond, California
 Benjamin Franklin Library, Mexico City, Mexico
 North American Cultural Institute, Mexico City, Mexico
 Newport Harbor Annual, Newport Beach, California
 San Francisco Museum of Art, San Francisco, California

Collections
 Marymount College, Palos Verdes, California
 Long Beach Museum of Art, Long Beach, California
 Richard Dana Junior High School, San Pedro, California
 Fort MacArthur, San Pedro, California
 John F. Kennedy Presidential Library and Museum, Boston, Massachusetts
 Richard Nixon Presidential Library and Museum, Yorba Linda, California

Affiliations
 Past President of the San Pedro Art Association (1953)
 California Water Color Society
 San Francisco Art Institute
 Los Angeles Art Association
 Artists Equity Association

References

Artists from San Francisco
American cartoonists
Abstract expressionist artists
1911 births
1963 deaths
Sheet metal workers
Painters from California
People from San Pedro, Los Angeles